Yeh Moh Moh Ke Dhaage was an Indian TV serial. It premiered on 21 March 2017 on Sony TV and ended on 18 August 2017. The series was produced by Mumtaz Saba Productions in association with Ochre Moving Pictures.

Synopsis
The story is set in Gujarat. The plot centers around a mature village man Raidhan Raj Katara "Rajai" who is a single man and lives with his sisters Dhingly and Rami in the small village of Amboli. He is looking for a bride with the help of Dharmavidya "Aru" who works for a matrimonial website and is based in the city of Ahmedabad. Dharmavidya is a 21-year old ambitious girl who works hard, living with her parents and her elder sister Dharmi in their uncle's house. Raidhan Raj Katara is the village councillor (Mukhi ji), unwilling to marry someone at the age of 42. He agrees under Dhingly's(Mishri) influence because Dhingly is marrying a young Deep. Aru is hired to find a girl for Mukhi ji. The two get to know each other and are surprised by each other's behaviors as they break stereotypes.

At last Aru's sister, Dharmi, professes a willingness to marry Mukhi ji so she can start a new life after her first husband leaves her to marry a rich girl. On the wedding day, Mukhi ji's elder sister, Rami, encourages and helps Dharmi run away to prevent Mukhi ji from getting married. At the request of Dhingly and Aru's parents, Aru marries Mukhi ji. The story then revolves around the relationship that develops between Mukhi ji and Aru and how they become part of each other's lives and dreams.

Cast
 Niyati Fatnani as Dharmavidya Raidhan Katara / Aru / Mukhiyani
 Eijaz Khan as Raidhan Raj Katara / Mukhi ji 
 Rima Ramanuj as Mishri Raj Katara / Dhingli, Mukhi ji's younger sister
 Ananya Khare as Rami Ben, Mukhi ji's elder sister who plots to kill him
Jia Mustafa as Dharmishta Nanavati / Dharmi
 Neha Narang as Rupa
 Benaf Dadachandji as Saanvi 
 Muni Jha as Arundhati and Dharmishta's father
Ani Sonpal as Savita Nanavati, Arundhati and Dharmishta's mother
Mugdha Shah as Rasika, Arundhati's aunt / Kaki
 Kenny Desai as Arundhati's uncle / Kaka
 Shivam Agarwal as Kishan
 Manish Khanna as Lalji Bhai
 Akshita Mudgal as Rasika's daughter

Music 
Hina Khan covered the song "Moh Moh Ke Dhagey" for the show, which was originally sung by singer Monali Thakur.

References

Official Website to Watch ye Moh Moh Ke Dhaggey - SonyLIV

Sony Entertainment Television original programming
2017 Indian television series debuts
2017 Indian television series endings
Hindi-language television shows
Indian drama television series
Television shows set in Gujarat